Asperdaphne sculptilis is a species of sea snail, a marine gastropod mollusk in the family Raphitomidae.

Description
(Original description) The shell is fusiformly turreted, moderately solid, pale brown. It contains 7 whorls, rounded, a little excavated next the sutures. They are longitudinally rather strongly costate, with about nine rounded ribs, between which are numerous fine erect longitudinal striae,. These become crescent- shaped on the flattened area below the sutures, and encircled with numerous concentric, somewhat irregular ridges, which are slightly nodulous at the intersections. The aperture is subpyriform. The outer lip is thin, sharp, variced externally, slightly sulcate within. The columella is straight. The siphonal canal is slightly produced and everted. The posterior sinus is rather deep.

Distribution
This marine species is endemic to Australia and occurs off New South Wales, Tasmania and Victoria.

References

 Hedley, C. 1903. Scientific results of the trawling expedition of H.M.C.S. Thetis off the coast of New South Wales in February and March, 1898. Mollusca. Part II. Scaphopoda and Gastropoda. Memoirs of the Australian Museum 4(6): 325–402, pls 36-37 
 Gatliff, J.H. & Gabriel, C.J. 1908. Additions to and revision of the Catalogue of Victorian marine Mollusca. Proceedings of the Royal Society of Victoria n.s. 21(1): 368–391
 May, W.L. 1923. An illustrated index of Tasmanian shells: with 47 plates and 1052 species. Hobart : Government Printer 100 pp.
 Powell, A.W.B. 1966. The molluscan families Speightiidae and Turridae, an evaluation of the valid taxa, both Recent and fossil, with list of characteristic species. Bulletin of the Auckland Institute and Museum. Auckland, New Zealand 5: 1–184, pls 1–23

External links
 
  Hedley, C. 1922. A revision of the Australian Turridae. Records of the Australian Museum 13(6): 213-359, pls 42-56 

sculptilis
Gastropods described in 1871
 Gastropods of Australia